Frank Freeman may refer to:

 Frank Freeman (architect) (1861–1949), Canadian-American architect
 Y. Frank Freeman (1890–1969), American studio head at Paramount Pictures
 Frank N. Freeman (1880–1961), American educational psychologist

See also
 Frank Freeman's Barber Shop, an 1852 plantation fiction novel by Baynard Rush Hall
 Franklin Freeman (born 1945), lawyer and public official in North Carolina
 Frankie Muse Freeman (1916–2018), American civil rights attorney
 Frank Freimann (1909–1968), American businessperson who was head of Magnavox